NSCC may refer to:

Medicine
 Neoplastic spinal cord compression
 Non-small-cell lung carcinoma

Organisations
 National Securities Clearing Corporation
 North Seattle Community College
 North Shore Community College
 Northwest State Community College
 Nova Scotia Community College
 United States Naval Sea Cadet Corps

Other
 North Star College Cup